Dollar Bay High School is located in Dollar Bay, Michigan. It was established in 1914 and lies right on the outer boundary of Dollar Bay, a small town on the Keweenaw Waterway. The school has less than 400 students, K-12. Most active students are from Dollar Bay, Tamarack City, Hubbell, and Lake Linden.

Academics
Dollar Bay offers dual enrollment for students through neighboring colleges, Gogebic Community College, Michigan Tech and Finlandia University. Students involved in this program will go to a university of choice for 2 hours and join in the class they have chosen. Dollar Bay offers  electives.

Sports and Clubs
Dollar Bay offers many sports and clubs for its student body.

Basketball
There are full Varsity and Junior Varsity boys and girls teams along with programs for middle school students and children in the elementary for early basketball development.

Hockey
Dollar Bay merges their team with nearby Jeffers High School to form a full squad.

Football
Dollar Bay participates in a co-op with Hancock High School.

Track
Varsity and Junior Varsity track teams are available for students 7-12 to join.

Golf
Starting in 2016, Golf is a co-ed sport available at the high school level.

Cross Country
Students in grades 7-12 can compete in Junior High, Junior Varsity or Varsity Cross Country.

Cheerleading
Cheerleading is open for girls 7-12.

Quiz bowl
Students 7-12 are eligible for quiz bowl.

Chorus
Chorus is offered for all students grade 7-12, and is held during lunch period on Mondays, Wednesdays, and Fridays.

References

External links

Educational institutions established in 1914
Public high schools in Michigan
Schools in Houghton County, Michigan
Public middle schools in Michigan
Public elementary schools in Michigan
1914 establishments in Michigan